This is a selected list of freeware video games implemented as traditional executable files that must be downloaded and installed.  Freeware games are games that are released as freeware and can be downloaded and played, free of charge, for an unlimited amount of time.

This list does not include:
Open source games (see List of open-source video games).
Games that were previously sold commercially (see List of commercial video games released as freeware).
Shareware or Free-to-play games that require purchase for play time, game items, new content or features.
Browser games alias browser-based games.
Mods: software that cannot be played as stand-alone game.

A
Aleph One is a modified version of the Marathon 2 engine
Ahriman's Prophecy is a prequel to the Aveyond RPG series.
Alien Swarm is a free top down shooter from Valve used to test the Source 2010 beta.
America's Army is the official United States Army game.
Anchorhead is a horror interactive fiction game.
ADOM is a roguelike game (technically postcardware) by Thomas Biskup.
Armored Brigade is a freeware tactical wargame, focusing on realism and playability.
Assault Cube is a Counter-Strike-like first person shooter with low system requirements.
Astro Battle is a top down multi-directional shooter in which players design their own spacecraft and battle other players on-line.

B
Barkley, Shut Up and Jam: Gaiden is a futuristic role-playing video game starring basketballer Charles Barkley.
Battleships Forever is a real time tactics game with a ship designer.
Beneath a Steel Sky, is a point-and-click adventure game.
BMW M3 Challenge is a BMW M3 car racing game.
Black Mesa (originally Black Mesa: Source; stylized as BLλCK MESA) is a third-party total remake of Half-Life.
BVE Trainsim is a railroad simulator created by Mackoy of Japan.
Broken Sword 2.5: The Return of the Templars is a fan-made Broken Sword game.

C
Cataclysm: Dark Days Ahead is a rogue-like survival game.
Cave Story is a side-scrolling action-adventure game.
Cellfactor: Revolution is a single-player and multiplayer game that uses the Ageia Physx engine.
Championship Manager: Season 01/02 is a football management video game in Sports Interactive's Championship Manager series.
Chex Quest is a comedic Doom clone (technically an advergame).
Chicken Invaders is a space shooter by InterAction Studios.
Chzo Mythos is a set of four separate adventure games: 5 Days a Stranger, 7 Days a Skeptic, Trilby's Notes and 6 Days a Sacrifice by Ben Croshaw.
Cloud is a third-person computer puzzle game based on weather and atmospheric aesthetics.
Continuum is a top-down multiplayer video game.

D
Deadly Rooms of Death is a turn-based puzzle game available in two free versions: Architect's Edition and browser-based Flash version.
Deepest Sword is a puzzle-platform game.
Digital - A Love Story is a computer mystery/romance set five minutes into the future of 1988.
DinoHunters is an advertisement-supported first person shooter and machinima series created by Kuma Reality Games.
Dogfights: The Game is a combat flight simulator based on the History Channel series of the same name.
Don't Shit Your Pants is a text-based browser game.
Dwarf Fortress is a real-time fantasy roguelike (technically donationware).
Doki Doki Literature Club! is a visual novel-based game developed by Team Salvato.

E
Eastside Hockey Manager is a hockey manager game.
Eternal Daughter is a Castlevania-style action-adventure game.
Elona is an open world roguelike game.
Elsword is a free-to-play MMORPG.
 Eversion

F
Food Force is a game where the player must deliver food to places in which people are starving.
Future Pinball is a pinball simulation editor and game with many tables available.
FNaF World, spin-off of FNaF.
Freddy Fazbear's Pizzeria Simulator PC version only.

G
Gate88 is an abstract top-down futuristic real-time strategy space combat simulator.
Genetos is a scrolling shooter.
General is a strategy game with text interface.
GeneRally is an arcade-style top-down racing game.
Grid Wars is a Geometry Wars clone.
GROW is a series of puzzle games.
Gunster is a discontinued multiplayer scrolling shooter.
Guns and Robots is a multiplayer third-person shooter.

H
Hero Core shooter game with Metroidvania elements.
Hydorah is a 2D Shoot 'em up in a similar vein to games such as Gradius. Was later released as a non-freeware title under the name Super Hydorah.

I
I'm O.K – A Murder Simulator is a satirical side-scrolling shooter by Derek Yu.
Ib is a horror/puzzle RPG creation game.
Icy Tower is a tower-climbing platform game.
Ikachan is an action-adventure game by Studio Pixel.
Iji is a platformer by Daniel Remar.
IMVU is an online social entertainment game.
Inner Worlds is a DOS platformer where you play a woman that turns into a wolf. (Sleepless Software, 1996) 
I Wanna Be the Guy is a platform game.

J
Jump 'n Bump is a multiplayer battle game. (Should be moved to List of open source games).
 is a Lego-themed puzzle game.

K
Knytt Stories is a 2D exploration platformer with a built in editor by Nicklas Nygren.

L
La-Mulana is a 2D platform game.
Lexus ISF Track Time is a Lexus ISF car racing game.
Liero is a 2D side-scrolling shooting game for one or two players.
Liyla and the Shadows of War is a 2D side-scrolling platform game about the 2014 Gaza War developed by Rasheed Abueideh.
Little Fighter is a beat'em up DOS fighting game.
Little Fighter 2 is a sequel to Little Fighter released for Windows.
Loved is a browser-based game released online to various game hosting websites.

M
Maldita Castilla is a platformer arcade action game released in 2012, developed by Locomalito.
Magestorm Revival is a team based FPS game recreated by KOD.
Mad Father is a RPG Maker game created by Miscreant's Room
Moon Whistle is a classic RPG Maker game made by Kannazuki Sasuke.
Monster Milktruck is a single-player online game using Google Earth technology.
MUGEN is a custom fighting game engine.
The Museum of Broken Memories is an adventure game by Jonas Kyratzes.

N
N is a classic platform game with advanced physics.
Narbacular Drop is a 3D puzzle game developed by Nuclear Monkey Software. It is the precursor to Valve's Portal.
Noctis is a space exploration simulator. (Should be moved to List of open source games).
Notrium is a survival game.
 is a hybrid retro racing game.

O
Off (video game) is a french (later translated into english) RPG game about an entity known as "The Batter" and his quest to purify the world of OFF.
One Night Trilogy is a series of three freeware survival horror games.
 free train simulator.
osu! is a freeware simulator of the rhythm video games Osu! Tatakae! Ouendan and Elite Beat Agents.

P
Perspective is a single player puzzle game that includes aspects of a 2-D platformer where the player switches between a 2D and a 3D game environment.
Plasma Pong is a Pong game in which the ball is manipulated by a fluid dynamics environment.  It is currently in development hell after the website became defunct.
Play65 is an online multi-player backgammon game featuring 3D graphics and community modules.
Plobb! is a fast single player 2D arcade shooter, and as a multidirectional shooter shares the gameplay of Asteroids. It features a distinctive game design.
Progress Quest is a parody of EverQuest and the MMORPG genre, focuses on pure character building with no interaction involved.
Project Reality is a standalone modification of tactical first-person shooter Battlefield 2.

R
Ragnarok Battle Offline is a 2D fighting game that is spin off of the MMO Ragnarok Online.
The Realms of Loria is a free browser-based multi-player online roleplaying game, set in Loria, a medieval fantasy world.

S
Samorost, is a point-and-click adventure game.
Scorched 3D is a 3D remake of an artillery game Scorched Earth.
A Second Face is a sci-fi adventure game.
Second Life is a virtual online world, created by its users. Developed by Linden Labs.
Seiklus is an ambient single-player action-adventure game.
SimSig is a train simulation game based on real UK signalling systems.
Skifree is a Windows 95 game.
Soldat is a 2d, fast-paced, action multi-player shooting game with many different game modes and weapon choices.
Space Combat is a 3D space simulator featuring realistic physics.
Space Tanks is a 2D/3D gravity game featuring realistic physics.
StepMania is a rhythm based online capable game.
SubSpace is a 2D top-down space shooter game with massive multiplayer capabilities.
Super Cosplay War Ultra is a 2D fighting game featuring cosplayers.
Synaesthete is a student-created psychedelic rhythm shooter.
Synth uses procedural generation for the graphics and level design.
Syobon Action is a Japanese game notorious for its difficulty.
Solitaire is a card game.

T
Tag: The Power of Paint is a 3D first-person action & puzzle game that uses paint to manipulate physics.
 and its sequel are 2D side-scrolling platform games.
TagPro is a browser-based multiplayer capture the flag game.
Temporal is a platform game involving time travel based puzzles.
The Dark Mod, inspired by the original Thief series.
Tinker, also known as Microsoft Tinker, is a 3D puzzle game for Windows.
Trackmania Nations is a 3D racing game specially developed for the Electronic Sports World Cup by Nadeo.
Transcendence is a 2D space adventure game featuring extended moddability.
TUMIKI Fighters is a 3D scrolling shooter.
Toribash is a 3D ragdoll fighting game in which you control every joint of your fighter.

U
Star Control II Ur-Quan Masters, puts you in the position of a space captain
UnReal World, a survival roguelike set in a world inspired by the late Iron Age of Finland

V
Vanguard Princess is a dōjin 2D fighting game
Visual Pinball is a pinball simulation editor and game with many tables available.
Vestaria Saga is a tactical role-playing game from the creator of the Fire Emblem series, Shouzou Kaga.

W
Warmonger: Operation Downtown Destruction is an apocalyptic, first-person shooter.
Warning Forever is a vertical shooter.
Within a Deep Forest is a 2D physics and exploration game.
WolfQuest is a wildlife simulation game.

Y
Yume Nikki is an "exploration" adventure game themed around dreams and nightmares with basic pixel graphics.

Z
Zineth is an indie, 3d person, skating game where you must traverse an environment with speed and agility.

See also

List of open-source video games
List of free massively multiplayer online games
List of free multiplayer online games
List of freeware
List of commercial video games released as freeware
List of commercial video games with later released source code

References

External links

Video game lists by license